The Elgin and Winter Garden Theatres are a pair of stacked theatres in Toronto, Ontario, Canada. The Winter Garden Theatre is seven storeys above the Elgin Theatre. They are the last surviving Edwardian stacked theatres in the world.

History

The pair of theatres were originally built as the flagship of Marcus Loew's theatre chain in 1913. The building was designed by architect Thomas W. Lamb, who also designed the Ed Mirvish Theatre nearby.

Both theatres were built to show vaudeville acts and the short silent movies of the time. Each theatre was intended for a different class of patron. The gold-and-marble, domed, 'hard-top' lower theatre (originally called Loew's Yonge Street Theatre) was home to continuous vaudeville and movies. The upper-level Winter Garden is an 'atmospheric' country garden under the stars, painted with murals of plants and garden trellises, with tree trunk columns and lantern lights. The upper theatre was built for the 'Big Time' vaudeville market and had reserved seats at premium prices, catering to affluent patrons. As well as competing in a different market, the upper theatre could be used for experimentation with acts, without the risk of closing the lower theatre.

By 1928, feature-length silent films were popular, but sound films were just coming into their own. In 1928, the lower theatre was converted to show sound films and the upper theatre was closed. The Winter Garden remained shuttered for about sixty years. Left inside it was a large collection of vaudeville flats and scenery, now the world's largest surviving collection. In 1969, Loews sold the Elgin to Famous Players. By the 1970s, the Elgin was showing mainly B movies and soft-core pornography.

Recent history
Since 1979, the Elgin Theatre has served as one of the hosts to the annual Toronto International Film Festival.

In 1981, the Ontario Heritage Foundation bought the structure from Famous Players. From March 1985 through March 1987 the musical Cats was very successfully presented in the essentially unrestored Elgin, showing the viability of the theatre. The building closed in 1987 for a full restoration and reopened in 1989.

In 1991, Dr. David Griesinger and Steve Barbar of Lexicon, Inc., at the request of acousticians Neil Muncy and Robert Tanner, installed the first production LARES system, an electroacoustic enhancement system that augments architectural acoustics, in the Elgin Theatre.  This initial LARES system used two microphones placed at the balcony's front edge to pick up sound from the stage. The microphone signals were digitized and processed in two mainframe computers, and the resulting signals were sent to 56 loudspeakers in the main ceiling and 60 under the balcony, for the purpose of providing additional intelligibility and ambience.

The Elgin Theatre housed the world premiere of the Napoleon musical in 1994, which later transferred to London's West End in 2000.  In 1995, it was home to The Who's Tommy musical. Since 1996, Ross Petty Productions has staged pantomimes at the Elgin Theatre each Christmas season.

From February 10 to 14, 2004, Conan O'Brien taped four episodes of NBC's Late Night with Conan O'Brien from the Elgin Theatre. The visit came about via Toronto City Council's CDN$1 million (~US$750,000 at the time) payment to NBC to have the U.S. national television program visit Toronto for a week of shows, part of the overall council-funded PR effort of promoting Toronto as a tourist destination for Americans in the wake of the widely publicized summer 2003 Severe acute respiratory syndrome (SARS) epidemic that adversely impacted the city's tourism industry.

The Elgin Theatre played host to the taping of Bryan Adams in Concert for the American broadcast of Great Performances on PBS. The show was filmed in July 2014 and first aired on March 1, 2015.

In popular culture
A pivotal scene in the 1973 made-for-TV film She Cried Murder takes place in the (then shuttered) Winter Garden.

The cover photos for Rush's 1981 live album Exit...Stage Left were shot at the Winter Garden and the Buffalo Memorial Auditorium.

The Winter Garden is seen in the 1994 film Camilla. The location is also featured in the 2017 movie The Shape of Water and receives an acknowledgement in the closing credits. The music video for "Changes" by the Montreal band Stars is also set there.

Emily St. John Mandel's 2014 novel Station Eleven begins on the stage of the Elgin Theatre.

Other Thomas Lamb theatres in Canada
 Ed Mirvish Theatre, Toronto
 Uptown Theatre, Toronto
 Capitol Cinema, Ottawa
 The Sanderson Centre for the Performing Arts, Brantford

See also
Opera Atelier

References

External links

Ontario Heritage Trust: The Elgin and Winter Garden Theatre Centre
Toronto's Historical Plaques – Loew's Yonge Street and Winter Garden Theatres
Toronto's Historical Plaques -Elgin and Winter Garden Theatres
Heritage Property Detail for 189 Yonge Street

Theatres in Toronto
National Historic Sites in Ontario
Movie palaces
Former cinemas in Toronto
City of Toronto Heritage Properties
Theatres on the National Historic Sites of Canada register
Ontario Heritage Trust
Loew's Theatres buildings and structures
Theatres completed in 1913
Thomas W. Lamb buildings